Titt is a surname. People with the surname Titt include:
George Frank Titt, Lord Mayor of Manchester 1930-31
John Wallis Titt (1841-1910), engineer and windmill manufacturer
William Titt (1881-1956), Olympic swimmer

See also
Tit (disambiguation)